is a Japanese comedy television drama series broadcast on TV Tokyo. It premiered on January 9, 2015 and ended on March 28, 2015.

Cast
Kumiko Asō
Maki Sakai
Tamaki Ogawa
Tōru Nakamura

References

External links
 

2015 Japanese television series debuts
2015 Japanese television series endings
Japanese comedy television series
Japanese drama television series
TV Tokyo original programming
Japanese supernatural television series